ILV may refer to:
 Instituto Lingüístico de Verano (Mexico), affiliate organisation of SIL International (Summer Institute of Linguistics), based in Mexico
 Instituto Lingüístico de Verano (Peru), affiliate organisation of SIL International (Summer Institute of Linguistics), based in Peru